The Na-Mi-Ba is a Czechoslovakian minimum metal bakelite cased anti-tank blast mine. The mine uses a horizontal lever fuze, with a very low operating pressure that breaks open a glass capsule containing acid, which initiates a flash composition. The mine has a small main charge, and is normally used as the initiator for larger charges. The low operating pressure means that the mine could be used as an anti-personnel mine.

The mine is no longer in service with the Czechoslovakian armed forces.

Specifications
 Diameter: 200 mm
 Height: 250 mm
 Explosive content: 2.2 kg of TNT
 Operating pressure: 2.2 kg

References

 Jane's Mines and Mine Clearance 2005-2006
 

Anti-tank mines